Through A Glass, Darkly (original Norwegian title: I et speil, i en gåte) is a novel by Norwegian author Jostein Gaarder published in 1993. An award-winning film adaptation was released in 2008. The title is a phrase from the First Epistle to the Corinthians, one of the epistles by Paul the Apostle.

Book 
The book won the author the Norwegian Booksellers' Prize for 1993, and has sold more than two million copies worldwide. In 1996, a German translation Durch einen Spiegel, in einem dunklen Wort won the Buxtehude Bull award for youth literature.

Summary 
The book describes a series of conversations between Cecilia, a girl lying ill in bed with terminal cancer, and Ariel, an angel who stepped in through her window, on the meaning of life.

Film 
The book was adapted to the screen by director Jesper W. Nielsen in 2008, entitled, like the book, I et speil, i en gåte. Marie Haagenrud played the leading character, Cecilia, and Aksel Hennie played the angel Ariel. The film won the Amanda Award for the best children's film for 2009.

References

External links 

 I et speil i en gåte on IMDb
 I et speil i en gåte on Norwegian Film Institute
 Review of film on Variety

Novels by Jostein Gaarder
1993 Norwegian novels
Norwegian novels adapted into films